Huta is a village (selo) in Zolochiv Raion, Lviv Oblast, in western Ukraine. It belongs to Busk urban hromada, one of the hromadas of Ukraine. Huta was established in 1600. The village has 244 inhabitants.

Until 18 July 2020, Huta belonged to Busk Raion. The raion was abolished in July 2020 as part of the administrative reform of Ukraine, which reduced the number of raions of Lviv Oblast to seven. The area of Busk Raion was merged into Zolochiv Raion.

References

External links
rada.gov.ua

Villages in Zolochiv Raion, Lviv Oblast